In mathematics, specifically in measure theory, the trivial measure on any measurable space (X, Σ) is the measure μ which assigns zero measure to every measurable set: μ(A) = 0 for all A in Σ.

Properties of the trivial measure

Let μ denote the trivial measure on some measurable space (X, Σ).
 A measure ν is the trivial measure μ if and only if ν(X) = 0.
 μ is an invariant measure (and hence a quasi-invariant measure) for any measurable function f : X → X.

Suppose that X is a topological space and that Σ is the Borel σ-algebra on X.
 μ trivially satisfies the condition to be a regular measure.
 μ is never a strictly positive measure, regardless of (X, Σ), since every measurable set has zero measure.
 Since μ(X) = 0, μ is always a finite measure, and hence a locally finite measure.
 If X is a Hausdorff topological space with its Borel σ-algebra, then μ trivially satisfies the condition to be a tight measure. Hence, μ is also a Radon measure. In fact, it is the vertex of the pointed cone of all non-negative Radon measures on X.
 If X is an infinite-dimensional Banach space with its Borel σ-algebra, then μ is the only measure on (X, Σ) that is locally finite and invariant under all translations of X. See the article There is no infinite-dimensional Lebesgue measure.
 If X is n-dimensional Euclidean space Rn with its usual σ-algebra and n-dimensional Lebesgue measure λn, μ is a singular measure with respect to λn: simply decompose Rn as A = Rn \ {0} and B = {0} and observe that μ(A) = λn(B) = 0.

References

Measures (measure theory)